Mylothris ochracea, the ochreous dotted border, is a butterfly in the family Pieridae. It is found in Nigeria and Cameroon. The habitat consists of primary forests.

The larvae feed on Santalales species.

References

Seitz, A. Die Gross-Schmetterlinge der Erde 13: Die Afrikanischen Tagfalter. Plate XIII 10

Butterflies described in 1895
Pierini
Butterflies of Africa